John Belasise (fl. 1393–1411), of Lincoln, was an English politician.

He was elected Mayor of Lincoln for 1394–1395 and a Member (MP) of the Parliament of England for Lincoln in 1393 and 1411.

References

14th-century births
15th-century deaths
Members of the Parliament of England (pre-1707) for Lincoln
Mayors of Lincoln, England
English MPs 1393
English MPs 1411